Peter John Dornan FRS (born 1939) is a British physicist, and professor at Imperial College London.

On 18 September 2009, a festschrift was held in his honor. Dornan was awarded the Rutherford Medal and Prize in 2002.

References

External links
 Google Scholar

1939 births
British physicists
Academics of Imperial College London
Fellows of the Royal Society
Living people